Mohammed Nadum (born 11 June 1939) is an Iraqi weightlifter. He competed in the men's middleweight event at the 1964 Summer Olympics.

References

1939 births
Living people
Iraqi male weightlifters
Olympic weightlifters of Iraq
Weightlifters at the 1964 Summer Olympics
Place of birth missing (living people)
20th-century Iraqi people